jj n° 3 is the second studio album by Swedish indie pop band JJ. It was released by Sincerely Yours and Secretly Canadian on 9 March 2010.

In April 2011, the first half of the first song from the album, "My Life", was featured in a gameplay trailer for the video game Battlefield 3.

Release
jj n° 3 was announced by Secretly Canadian on 24 December 2009. The album was released on 9 March 2010 in collaboration with Sincerely Yours. jj n° 3 was named Rough Trade's "Album of the Month" in April 2010.

The third song on the album, "Let Go", was released on 15 January 2010 for free on the Sincerely Yours website. A music video for "Let Go" was released on February 24, 2010 on the website. The music video was directed by Marcus Söderlund and was shot in black and white. It featured both band members, a dog and close-ups of different items as they were stained with blood.

Track listing

References

2010 albums
JJ (Swedish band) albums
Secretly Canadian albums